The system of trademark law in mainland China is administered by the China National Intellectual Property Administration CNIPA (with an appeal function administered by the Trademark Review and Adjudication Board and the courts). Both are divisions of the State Administration for Industry & Commerce (SAIC).

The two principal pieces of legislation forming the trademark system are the Trademark Law, and the Unfair Competition Law.

Only registered trade and service marks are protected in the PRC: there is no common law protection for unregistered trademarks (except for "well-known" marks, as detailed below).

Amendments to the PRC's Trademark Law on October 27, 2001 allows three-dimensional trademarks and colours to be registered as trade marks. Collective and certification trademarks can also now be registered in China.  are also now recognised under Chinese law (the courts and administrative bodies will take into account the level of knowledge of the trademark by relevant consumers, the length of use of the trademark, the amount of publicity given to the mark in China, and the history of the mark).

Trademark piracy is a rampant problem for trademark owners in China, despite the highly effective and speedy administrative raid procedure available to trademark owners under the auspices of the State Administration for Industries and Commerce.

See also
 Intellectual property
 Law in the People's Republic of China
 Chinese law
 Hong Kong trademark law

Further reading 
 Alford, William P.,To Steal a Book Is an Elegant Offense: Intellectual Property Law in Chinese Civilization, Stanford, Calif. : Stanford University Press, 1995. 
 Paul Kossof, "Chinese Trademark Law: The New Chinese Trademark Law of 2014," (Carolina Academic Press, Durham, North Carolina 2014). .
 Paul Kossof, Mini-Series on Chinese Trademark Law: Welcome to The New Chinese Trademark Law of 2014, available at http://www.asialawportal.com/2014/03/29/mini-series-on-chinese-trademark-law-welcome-to-the-new-chinese-trademark-law-of-2014/

External links
 State Administration for Industry and Commerce (SAIC)

Trademark law by jurisdiction
People's Republic of China intellectual property law

China Trademark Law